Desmiphora maculosa is a species of beetle in the family Cerambycidae. It was described by Linsley and Chemsak in 1966. It is known from the Galapagos Islands.

References

Desmiphora
Beetles described in 1966